Notaris puncticollis is a species of marsh weevil in the beetle family Brachyceridae.

Habitat 
Notaris puncticollis mainly lives in wetlands. The range of this species is boreal transcontinental.

References

Further reading

 
 

Brachyceridae
Articles created by Qbugbot
Beetles described in 1876